The Tyrrell 021 was a Formula One racing car designed by Mike Coughlan for Tyrrell Racing and raced during the  season. The car was powered by a Yamaha V10 engine and was driven by Ukyo Katayama and Andrea de Cesaris. The car was unsuccessful with no points scored during the season. The 021 was replaced by the Harvey Postlethwaite designed 022 for the  season.

Complete Formula One results
(key)

References

Tyrrell Formula One cars